Maryland's 2nd congressional district elects a representative to the United States House of Representatives every two years.  The district comprises parts of Carroll and Baltimore counties, as well as small portions of the City of Baltimore. The seat has been represented by Dutch Ruppersberger of the Democratic Party since 2003.

Historical boundaries
When it was first organized in the late 1780s, the Maryland 2nd congressional district consisted of the northern portion of the eastern shore of Maryland and the area where the Susquehanna River empties into the Chesapeake Bay. It had a population of 55,008 in 1790.

After the 1790 census, Maryland gained two seats in the house.  The new 2nd district essentially consisted of Howard County, Prince George's County and Anne Arundel County.  The boundary ran on a line heading north-east from the north-west corner of the District of Columbia so that a small portion of Montgomery County was also in the 2nd district.

This remained the boundaries of the district until the post–1830 census redistricting.  At this time the 2nd district was moved back to the eastern shore region where it had been at first.  The only change between the district's boundaries in 1790 and those in 1834 was that in the latter year Caroline County was part of the 2nd district.

In the 1842 redistricting, which involved a decrease in the total number of representatives, Maryland went back to having only six members of the house.  The second district was moved again and now composed the Maryland Panhandle, that is all of Maryland starting with Frederick County and going west.

The post-1850 census redistricting caused another drastic redrawing of Maryland's  congressional districts.  The second district was moved back to the East side of the state.  However this time it only had the eastern shore as far south as Kent County.  However going westward it had Harford County, northern and western Baltimore County and the western and most southerly portions of Baltimore.  It also took in Carroll County.

In the 1862 redistricting process, Maryland was reduced to having only five congressional districts.  The second was cut down in size though to only having Harford County, eastern and northern Baltimore County including some areas now within the city boundaries on Baltimore.

In the 1872 redistricting, Maryland rose to six districts.  However the area of the 2nd district increased.  This was partly because it lost some of its area on the east side of Baltimore to the third district.  It now also consisted of virtually all of Baltimore county, and the northern reaches of Baltimore.  Cecil County was returned to its area, but Kent County remained in the first district.  Carroll County was also put back in the second district.  Thus the second district in 1873 was closer to that of 1853 than of 1871 in terms of the area within its boundaries.

In 1890, there was a small portion of the city of Baltimore that was moved from the 4th district and placed in the 7th district.  It appears this was in the general area where Freemont meets Fulton and then a little further south along Freemont.  These boundaries remained until the 1898 elections.  In that year a few more north-west Baltimore neighborhoods were transferred from the 4th to the 2nd district, as well as a few north-central Baltimore neighborhoods.

In 1902, another change was done to congressional district boundaries in Maryland.  With the northward growth of population in Baltimore the 4th and 3rd districts boundaries were moved into areas previously in the 2nd district.  however areas in north-west Baltimore that were closer to down-town were shifted into the 2nd district.  Cecil County was moved to the first district.  The arm of Baltimore County around Arbutus had long been in the 5th District but at this point it was transferred into the 2nd district. These remained the boundaries of the 2nd district for the next 50 years.

In 1952, Maryland redrew its congressional districts because it had gained another seat in Congress.  The 2nd district lost all of its area within the city of Baltimore, so it now consisted of Baltimore, Carroll and Harford Counties.

In 1966, Maryland redrew its congressional districts to follow the rule of "One man, one vote". This was especially necessary since the state had been electing one of its congressmen at large in the previous two elections.  A portion of Baltimore County along Baltimore's north-east border was removed from the 2nd district.  The Arbutus section of Baltimore county was also removed from the district along with a slightly further north portion of the county reaching to about Garrison.  Most of Carroll County was moved to the Maryland panhandle based 6th district.

In 1972, Harford County was moved to the First District.  The remaining portion of Carroll County was moved to the 6th district.  However the Garrison area of Baltimore County, all of Baltimore county east of Baltimore and even a very small part of Baltimore itself were moved back into the second district.

In 1982, some of the areas that had been in the 2nd district just north and west of Baltimore were moved into Maryland's 3rd congressional district.  At the same time, a part of Harford County was moved back into the 2nd congressional district.

In 2012, the district was found to be the eleventh least compact congressional district in the United States.

Recent election results in statewide races

Recent elections

2000s

/

2010s

2020s

List of members representing the district

Historical district boundaries

See also

Maryland's congressional districts
List of United States congressional districts

Notes

References

02
1789 establishments in Maryland
Constituencies established in 1789